The 2017 Zimbabwe Premier Soccer League is the 38th season of top-tier football in Zimbabwe. The season begins on 1 April 2017. CAPS United are the defending champions, coming off their fifth league title (including one in the Rhodesia National Football League).

Teams

The league expanded to 18 for the 2017 season, with 14 sides returning from the 2016 season and four promoted from the 2016 Zimbabwe Division 1, Bantu Rovers, Black Rhinos, Shabanie Mine and Yadah. On the other hand, Mutare City and Border Strikers finished as the bottom two teams of the 2016 season and will play in the Zimbabwe Division 1 for the 2017 season. CAPS United are the defending champions from the 2016 season.

Stadiums and locations

Results

League table

Result table
All teams play in a double round robin system (home and away).

Positions by round

Season statistics

Goals

Top scorers

Hat-tricks

References

2017 in African association football leagues
Zimbabwe Premier Soccer League